The Christchurch–Lyttelton Motorway, also known as Tunnel Road, is part of the road network connecting Christchurch, New Zealand with its port at Lyttelton. It is part of State Highway 74.

Route

The northern terminus is a roundabout on Ferry Road, a few hundred metres southeast of an intersection with the Christchurch ring route. The motorway immediately crosses the Heathcote river and is carried on an embankment south across its swampy floodplain. The northern section is two lane, unlit and is relatively lightly trafficked, with the majority of traffic entering at a grade-separated parclo interchange with Port Hills Road which connects via the Opawa Expressway to the north and west.
South of the interchange the motorway climbs the western side of the Heathcote Valley, with a crawler lane and passing through some cuttings. The access road to Horotane valley, a side valley of the Heathcote, passes beneath the motorway, connecting to Port Hills Road which continues in parallel to the motorway.

At the head of the Heathcote Valley is the north entrance to the Lyttelton road tunnel, with a southbound on-ramp and northbound off-ramp to Bridle Path road. The tunnel's toll plaza was located here prior to the abolition of tolls in 1979. The speed limit is restricted to 50 km/h in the Lyttelton Road Tunnel. The motorway terminates at a roundabout immediately at the Lyttelton end of the tunnel.

History
The 6.1 km road was completed in 1964 with the opening of the Lyttelton road tunnel, the country's second-longest road tunnel. It is designated a motorway, with pedestrians and cyclists excluded, although for the most part the road is 2-3 lane undivided carriageway.

Interchanges

References

Motorways in New Zealand
Transport in Christchurch
Two-lane expressways